General Pinto Partido is a partido on the northern border of Buenos Aires Province in Argentina.

The partido and its district capital are named after General Manuel Guillermo Pinto, who fought in the defence of Buenos Aires against the English and in the Argentine War of Independence. He later went on to serve as Governor of Buenos Aires.

The partido was reduced in size in 1991 due to the creation of Florentino Ameghino Partido.

Settlements
General Pinto
Colonia San Ricardo (Estación Iriarte)
Dos Hermanos
Dussaud
El Peregrino
Günther
Ingeniero V. Balbín (Villa Roth)
Los Callejones
Pazos Kanki
Villa Francia (Estación Coronel Granada)
Germania

External links

 

1891 establishments in Argentina
Partidos of Buenos Aires Province